Karen Ann Bittermann Kitzmiller (November 28, 1947 – May 20, 2001) was an American politician.

Kitzniller was born in Champaign, Illinois and went to public schools in Ohio, Florida, and Maryland. She graduated from Cornell University in 1969 with a bachelor's degree in home economics. Kitzmiller lived in Montpelier, Vermont with her husband Warren Kitzmiller. Kitzmiller was an artist, a social worker, and was the owner of a bed and breakfast house in Montpelier, Vermont. Kitzmiller served in the Vermont House of Representatives from 1991 until her death in 2001 from breast cancer, at her home, in Montpelier, Vermont. She was a Democrat. Warren Kitzmiller was then appointed to the Vermont General Assembly when his wife Karen Kitzmiller died.

References

1947 births
2001 deaths
People from Champaign, Illinois
People from Montpelier, Vermont
Artists from Vermont
Businesspeople from Vermont
Cornell University alumni
Women state legislators in Vermont
Democratic Party members of the Vermont House of Representatives
Deaths from breast cancer
Deaths from cancer in Vermont